Kumarapalayam is a state assembly constituency in Namakkal District of Tamil Nadu. Its State Assembly Constituency number is 97. It consists of a portion of Kumarapalayam taluk. It is included in the Namakkal Parliamentary Constituency. It is one of the 234 State Legislative Assembly Constituencies in Tamil Nadu.

It was newly formed in the year of 2008 by separating the Sankari and Tiruchengode constituencies.

It covers Kumarapalayam Municipality & the majority of Pallipalayam Block. It covers till Bhavani constituency in the north &
Erode East with the river Kaveri as its boundary.

Members of the Legislative Assembly

Election results

2021

2016

2011

References 

 

Assembly constituencies of Tamil Nadu
Namakkal district